Chris Delaney (born July 16, 1957) is a former professional tennis player from the United States.

Delaney enjoyed most of his tennis success while playing doubles. During his career he won 3 doubles titles.

Delaney's older brother James was also a touring pro.

Grand Prix and WCT finals

Doubles (3 wins, 1 loss)

External links
 
 

American male tennis players
Sportspeople from Newton, Massachusetts
Tennis people from Massachusetts
1957 births
Living people
20th-century American people